The 2017 Major League Baseball All-Star Game was the 88th edition of the Major League Baseball All Star Game. The game was hosted by the Miami Marlins and was played at Marlins Park on July 11, 2017. It was televised nationally by Fox. The game was the first since 2002 whose outcome did not determine home-field advantage for the World Series; instead, the team with the better regular-season record will have home-field advantage. The Marlins were announced as the hosts on February 10, 2015, by Major League Baseball Commissioner Rob Manfred; the game was the Marlins' first time hosting, leaving the Tampa Bay Rays as the only MLB franchise not to have hosted an All-Star game.

The Marlins initially were slated to host the 2000 All-Star Game, prior to having it revoked by then-National League president Len Coleman due to the concerns of both the franchise's long-term viability in the South Florida market, along with the habitually low attendance figures at Pro Player Stadium. That game was eventually moved to Turner Field in Atlanta. The Houston Astros led all of baseball in sending a record six All-Stars to the game.

The American League won, 2–1, in 10 innings. Robinson Canó, second baseman for the Seattle Mariners, hit the game-winning home run for the American League and was named the 2017 All-Star Game Most Valuable Player.

Fan balloting

Starters
Balloting for the 2017 All-Star Game starters began online May 1 and ended on June 29. The top vote-getters at each position (including the designated hitter for the American League) and the top three among outfielders, would be starters for their respective leagues. The results were announced on July 2. Bryce Harper was the leading vote-getter with 4,630,306 votes.

Final roster spot
After the rosters were finalized, a second ballot of five players per league was created for the All-Star Final Vote to determine the 33rd and final player of each roster. The online balloting was conducted from July 2 through July 6. The winners of the All-Star Final Vote were Mike Moustakas of the American League's Kansas City Royals and Justin Turner of the National League's Los Angeles Dodgers.

Rosters

American League

National League

Roster notes

Mookie Betts was named starter in place of Mike Trout due to injury.
Justin Upton was named as the roster replacement for Mike Trout due to injury.
Chris Devenski was named as the roster replacement for Dallas Keuchel due to injury.
Alex Wood was named as the roster replacement for Clayton Kershaw due to Kershaw starting on Sunday.
Robinson Canó was named as the roster replacement for Starlin Castro due to injury.
Roberto Osuna was named as the roster replacement for Yu Darvish due to Darvish starting on Sunday.
Chris Archer was named as the roster replacement for Michael Fulmer due to Fulmer starting on Sunday.
Brandon Kintzler was named as the roster replacement for Corey Kluber due to Kluber starting on Sunday.
#: Indicates player would not play (replaced as per reference notes above).

Game summary

The game was mostly pitching-dominated through the first four innings. After a two-out double by Jonathan Schoop, Miguel Sanó finally got the AL on the board with his fifth inning RBI bloop single. In the bottom of the sixth, Yadier Molina became the oldest catcher to hit a home run in an All-Star game, when he hit one off Ervin Santana in the sixth inning, tying the game at one. Reggie Smith was the last Cardinal to hit an All-Star Game home run in the 1974 game. Robinson Canó hit the game-winning home run in the tenth inning off Wade Davis, and was named the All-Star Game Most Valuable Player. He is the first second baseman since 1998 who was named All-Star Game MVP. Andrew Miller struck out Cody Bellinger swinging to end the night and earned his first career All-Star save.

Starting lineup

Line score

National Anthems
Jocelyn Alice sang the Canadian national anthem while Bebe Rexha sang the American national anthem.

Ratings
The viewership ratings for the game on FOX were up slightly following the previous year's all-time low, with a 5.5 national rating, an 11 share, and an estimated 9.28 million viewers.

See also

List of Major League Baseball All-Star Games
Major League Baseball All-Star Game Most Valuable Player Award
All-Star Futures Game
Home Run Derby

Notes

References

External links
 

Major League Baseball All-Star Game
All-Star Game
Baseball competitions in Miami
Major League Baseball All-Star
2010s in Miami
Major League Baseball All-Star